The Science Focus Program (SFP) or Zoo School, or simply Zoo, is a part of Lincoln Public Schools and is one of the district's three focus programs, along with the Arts and Humanities Focus Program and the Career Academy. It is located at the Lincoln Children's Zoo in Lincoln, Nebraska, United States, and is described as "a small community of mature learners participating both in a traditional and non-traditional style of learning. A place where students play an active role in defining their learning environment and education."

Staff

The Science Focus Program has five teachers:
 Pete White: History and Social Studies
 Johnna Graff: English and Communication
 Emily Rose-Seifferlein: Chemistry, Anatomy and Physiology, Physical Science, and Geoscience
 Andrew "Mark" James: Physics, Biology, Animal Behavior, and Astronomy
 Matt Johnson: Mathematics

Amy Proffitt serves as secretary, Trudy Dormier as special education coordinator, Emily Trotter as security officer, and James Blake as the Principal.

Academic form

The Science Focus Program runs on an A-day/B-day block schedule, with the days alternating throughout the week. Wednesdays, known as "Focus Days", are commonly run on an alternative schedule, reserved for additional class times for core classes and applied arts.

Instead of having a finals week, Science Focus Program has a portfolio week. Portfolios are projects that are specific to each class that are used in place of finals. Each class has its own portfolio. Portfolios are handed out during each semester and students are expected to complete and present them at the end of the semester.

Campus

The Science Focus Program's campus is located in the southeast corner of the Lincoln Children's Zoo. The two portable buildings house the computer lab, a science room and laboratory, and the English classroom. The Camelot Commons, a larger, 2-story structure at the edge of the Science Focus Program campus, houses the social science, mathematics, and natural science classrooms.

History

The idea for the Science Focus Program originated in 1995. Teachers met and worked part-time planning for the program, and part-time teaching at their high schools.

The main idea for the focus program was to give students an alternative to regular high school. The teachers' vision consisted of a place where students could come and feel welcome and comfortable enough to express their individual talents and ideas.

The school opened for the 1997–1998 school year, accepting juniors and seniors. Since then, changes have been made, allowing the Science Focus Program to accept sophomores and freshmen.

On September 14, 2017, the Science Focus Program was visited by President Donald Trump's education secretary, Betsy DeVos. Her appearance was met with student protesters on the inside and public protesters outside, though the school day was urged to proceed as normal and no serious incidents occurred. The school's small class size was praised by DeVos.

For many years, the Lincoln Children's Zoo hosted a "Science Day" in which the public, along with elementary schools, walk around the zoo as Science Focus Program students enrich their knowledge with fun scientific activities. All students worked stations and participated.

The Science Focus Program is expected to have a new, single building (differing from the current 3 building setup) on the outskirts of the Lincoln Children's Zoo, correlating with the Lincoln Children's Zoo expansion plans. The building is expected to be finished in July 2019.

Student life
The Science Focus Program enrolls new students every year. Official clubs include the Key Club, Science Olympiad, Women in STEM Club, Dungeons and Dragons Club, and Yearbook Club. Former clubs include Minecraft Club, Biking Club, G&S Enterprises, Poker Club, Roots & Shoots, Gardening Club, Coloring Club, and Magic: The Gathering Club.

Notable alumni

See also
 PAST Foundation
 Arts and Humanities Focus Program

References

External links

Education in Lincoln, Nebraska
Schools in Lincoln, Nebraska
Focus programs in Lincoln, Nebraska
Public high schools in Nebraska
Magnet schools in Nebraska
Educational institutions established in 1997
1997 establishments in Nebraska